Jabur, alternately Jabor (Chinese: 雅姆), is a small town in Kemaman District, Terengganu, Malaysia..

Kemaman District
Towns in Terengganu